Daphne and the Diplomat is a 1937 German comedy film directed by Robert A. Stemmle and starring Karin Hardt, Gerda Maurus and Hans Nielsen.

The film's sets were designed by the art director Artur Günther.

Cast
 Karin Hardt as Daphne
 Gerda Maurus as Maria Arni
 Hans Nielsen as Achim Hell
 Karl Schönböck as Bentley
 Elsa Wagner as Frau Wachsmut
 Ingeborg von Kusserow as Matz
 Erich Ziegel as Friedrichsen
 Paul Dahlke as Doctor Kolbe
 Ilse Meudtner as Mercedes
 Hanna Seyferth as Terpsi
 Manon Chafour as Schleifchen
 Ilselore Wöbke as Rolli
 Anny Seitz as Anton
 Ruth Störmer as Feo
 Waltraut von Negelein as Bianca

References

Bibliography

External links
 

1937 films
Films of Nazi Germany
1930s German-language films
Films directed by Robert A. Stemmle
1937 comedy films
German comedy films
UFA GmbH films
German black-and-white films
1930s German films